The Toshiba–Kongsberg scandal (known in Japan as the Toshiba Machine Cocom violation case)  was a late Cold War controversy that arose in 1987 when some member nations of the Coordinating Committee for Multilateral Export Controls (CoCom) violated foreign exchange and foreign trade laws when they exported machine tools to the Soviet Union that could be used in combination with the Kongsberg numerical control (NC) devices made in Norway, in violation of the CoCom agreement. The equipment allowed the submarine technology of the Soviet Union to progress significantly as it was being used to mill quieter propellers for Soviet submarines.

The incident strained relations between the United States and Japan and resulted in the arrest and prosecution of two senior executives, as well as the imposition of sanctions on Kongsberg by both countries.

The Incident
The Toshiba Machine division (at that time) was a 50.1% subsidiary of Toshiba, a major Japanese manufacturer of machine tools and a general electronics manufacturer. Toshiba Machine's sales to the entire Toshiba Group accounted for about 10%, and Toshiba Machine's exports to the communist bloc accounted for less than 20% of total sales.

Between December 1982 to 1984, Toshiba Machine supplied eight "machine tools", NC devices, and associated software to control the machine tools to the Soviet Union's Technical Machinery Import Corporation through Wako Trading, a dummy company of Itochu Corporation. Exported via route was a high-performance model capable of simultaneous 9-axis control, for which exports were prohibited through the Coordinating Committee for Multilateral Export Controls (CoCom). Despite these controls, Toshiba Machine and Itochu Corporation exported the machines to the Soviet Union from 1982 to 1983 and modified associated software in 1984. 

Toshiba Machine, Itochu Corporation, and the Wako Trading Co. Ltd. employees recognized that exporting to the communist bloc of the "machine tools" ordered by the Soviet Union was not permitted. Wako created a false export permit application claiming it was exporting a large vertical lathe for control. For proof, they provided a signed contract to reassemble it overseas. The Japanese Ministry of International Trade and Industry, in charge of export control, did not see through the falsification of the permit application.

Exposed
At the end of 1986, the U.S. federal government learned of this transaction from an informant at Wako Trading, an employee called Kumagai Doku. The Pentagon conducted an investigation and concluded that the contract had contributed to the recent rapid improvement in the quietness of the Soviet Union Navy's nuclear-powered attack submarines. It subsequently notified the Japanese government through Atsuyuki Sasa, Director of the Cabinet Security Office, in a report in March 1987, the first report on the incident.

On the 19th, the Pentagon issued a statement that the U.S. government had learned that Japanese machine tooling, used to make screws for submarines, had been sent to the Soviet Union and that this was suspected of violating CoCom regulations. It announced that the Japanese government had been requested to conduct an investigation. According to sources familiar with the matter, the machine tool in question was believed to be a product of Toshiba Machine, a 50% subsidiary of Toshiba.
The tooling was believed to be a type of milling machine used to make propeller blades for ships, a general-purpose technical product that can be diverted to military technology. The Soviet Union was said to be using it to develop and manufacture new blades to reduce the screw noise of submarines.

It continued to state that it was not clear when and how the Soviet Union had acquired the equipment. However, the US government pointed out that Norwegian weapons maker Kongsberg had also provided similar machine tooling. Using these acquisitions, the Soviet Union reduced screw noise, which is a clue to detect, identify, and track submarines. The reduction could make it difficult for the U.S. Navy to track Soviet submarines, according to the Pentagon. 

For this reason, the US government requested the Japanese and Norwegian governments to investigate the circumstances under which these machines had been exported. It called for "appropriate action" to be taken based on the international understanding of CoCom and their respective domestic laws if violations of CoCom were revealed.

After that, in June, former Minister of International Trade and Industry, Tamura, who was sent to the United States by Japan's Prime Minister Yasuhiro Nakasone, formally apologized to US Secretary of Defense Casper Weinberger.

Investigation and trial
On April 30, 1987, the Japanese Police searched Toshiba Machine's premises. On May 27, two executives of Toshiba Machine were arrested for violating the Foreign Exchange Law, a Japanese domestic law, regarding the false application. A trial was held with Toshiba Machine being indicted.

On March 22, 1988, the Tokyo District Court handed down a judgment. Toshiba Machine was fined 2 million yen, and two executives were sentenced to 10 months in prison (with 3 years of suspension) and 1 year in prison (with 3 years of suspension). Chairman Shoichi Sawa and president Ichiro Watarisugi resigned from their parent company Toshiba. The term of office of chairman Sami, who had been expected to become a major force at Toshiba, was cut short. He was succeeded by Joichi Aoi.

Ryuzo Sejima, an adviser to Itochu Corporation, was demoted. Sejima was the brains of the Nakasone Cabinet. However, statements made by second secretary Yuri Rastovorov and Ivan Kovalenko raised suspicions that he was a Soviet spy, which caused a stir.

Diplomatic and trade consequences
In the United States, in addition to restrictions for Toshiba Machine, the import of all products of the Toshiba Group, including Toshiba itself, was strictly prohibited. In addition, in front of the White House, there were emotional reactions, such as a performance in which members of Congress smashed Toshiba radio cassette players and TVs with hammers

Congressman Hunter, the central figure in the investigation of Toshiba in Congress, severely criticized Toshiba for putting the lives of American soldiers in danger by exporting the tools because the range at which American nuclear submarines could detect Soviet nuclear submarines was reduced by 50%. He argued that it would be necessary to invest $30 billion to build 30 new nuclear submarines within 10 years.

Impact
In response to the affair, Toshiba carried out lobbying activities in Congress between 1987 and 1989 to ease the sanctions. The amount of money invested by Toshiba, the number of lobbyists, and the scale of its activities were said to be the largest ever. Houlihan, a lobbyist law firm, argued that Toshiba and Toshiba Machine were separate companies and had some success.

Details
The machine tool that combined with the Norwegian numerical control (NC) device and was exported to the Soviet Union (based on the Norwegian Police Service report).

See also
 History of computing in the Soviet Union
 Soviet computing technology smuggling

References

Further reading
 
 
 

1987 in Japan
1987 in the United States
Computing in the Soviet Union
Espionage scandals and incidents
Foreign trade of the Soviet Union
Japan–Soviet Union relations
Japan–United States relations
Norway–Soviet Union relations
Political scandals in the United States
Smuggling
Toshiba